BetterCloud, an independent software vendor based in New York, NY and with engineering offices in Atlanta, GA, builds unified SaaS management software. A venture-backed startup, BetterCloud has raised $187 million in total funding, with the most recent round was led by Warburg Pincus with series F funding with $75 million raised to date. A previous round of funding was done in April 2018 which was led by Bain Capital Ventures. In December 2016, BetterCloud completed pivot from G Suite to general SaaS management.

History
BetterCloud, founded in November 2011 in New York City, by founder and CEO David Politis and former CTO David Hardwick. Soon after, the company launched DomainWatch, which was a security tool for Google Docs, Google Sites and Google Calendar.

In May 2012 shortly after its launch, BetterCloud raised $2.2 million in seed funding from undisclosed angel investors. In January 2013, with its FlashPanel product reportedly serving 15,000 domains and 5.5 million end-users, the company raised a Series A round of $5 million in venture capital from Flybridge Capital Partners, Greycroft Partners and TriBeCa Venture Partners, bringing its total funding at the time to $7.2 million.

On September 25, 2013, the company successfully raised a Series B round of $6 million led by Flybridge Capital Partners with participation from Greycroft Partners, BLH Venture Partners, TriBeCa Venture Partners, Bear Creek Capital, and Hallett Capital. With a total funding of $13.2 million, the company has announced it is expanding its products to serve as the foundational layer for the cloud based software space, serving companies such as Zendesk and Salesforce.com.

In February 2015, the company rebranded its early product, FlashPanel, to BetterCloud for Google Apps, and also announced the launch of an additional product, BetterCloud for Office 365 [Beta]. The launch of an insight, monitoring, and alerting product for Microsoft Office 365 rounded out the company's offerings of solutions for the two major cloud messaging and collaboration platforms. And in March 2015, BetterCloud raised an additional $25 million in funding, led by Accel Partners and with participation from all existing investors. In April 2018, BetterCloud raised $60 million in a Series E funding led by Bain Capital Ventures bringing the company's total funding to $107 million. With this investment, the company doubled its valuation to $270 million.

In December 2016, BetterCloud pivoted from G Suite to general SaaS management. As of September 2018, the company supported connections to 10 SaaS apps: G Suite, Atlassian, Box, Dropbox, Namely, Office 365, Okta, Salesforce, Slack, and Zendesk.

BetterCloud closed a $60 million Series E funding round in April 2018, led by Bain Capital Ventures' Enrique Salem, former CEO of Symantec. This round doubled the company's valuation to $270 million. One month later, BetterCloud and Okta, an identity and access management provider, announced a partnership to connect their.

In March 2019 BetterCloud opened its platform's operations dashboard to any SaaS.

In September 2019, Dropbox announced a partnership with BetterCloud and an investment of $5 million.

In the same month, the company also launched the Integration Center.

Corporate affairs

Leadership 
BetterCloud is managed by CEO and founder David Politis. Other key executives are:

 Bart Hacking, Chief Financial Officer
 Rachel Orston, Chief Customer Officer
 Chris Jones, Chief Revenue Officer
 Jim Brennan, Chief Product Officer
 Shreyas Sadalgi, Chief Business Strategy Officer

Customer and revenue 
As of 2018, the company reports a network of around 2,500 customers, 14,000 IT professionals, and operates in around 60 countries.

Awards 

 BetterCloud was ranked #11 on Crain's Best Places to Work in NYC 2018.

References

External links
 

Software companies established in 2011
Companies based in New York City
Software companies based in New York (state)
Software companies of the United States
American companies established in 2011